British Institute of Archaeology may refer to:

British Institute in Ankara, an overseas research institute in Ankara, Turkey, formerly known as the British Institute of Archaeology at Ankara
British Institute in Amman, an overseas research institute in Amman, Jordan, formerly known as the British Institute at Amman for Archaeology and History
UCL Institute of Archaeology, a department of University College London
Institute of Archaeology (Oxford), a department of the University of Oxford
McDonald Institute for Archaeological Research, a research institute at the University of Cambridge
Royal Archaeological Institute, a learned society of archaeologists
Chartered Institute for Archaeologists, a professional body for archaeologists
British School at Athens, now specialised in Greek Studies and founded in 1886 as an archaeological institute in Athens, Greece

See also
 British Institute
 Institute of Archaeology (disambiguation)